bitComposer Interactive GmbH was a video game publisher headquartered in Eschborn, Germany. Founded in March 2009 as bitComposer Games GmbH, the company focuses on PC, console, mobile, and online platforms. In December 2010, bitComposer founded the subsidiary bitComposer Online to focus on developing and distributing free-to-play online and browser games. bitComposer releases international and local titles in physical media and digital download formats. bitComposer was renamed to bitComposer Entertainment AG on 22 December 2011. bitComposer Entertainment continued to publish its PC, console and handheld titles under the bitComposer Games label. Following insolvency, the company was dissolved on 15 January 2015, but eventually came back together as bitComposer Interactive GmbH.

bitComposer owns the rights to the Jagged Alliance license. In December 2012, bitComposer was involved in a dispute with GSC Game World over ownership of the rights to the S.T.A.L.K.E.R. game license. Again in 2013, bitComposer had a public dispute with developer Coreplay over the funding and release of the canceled role-playing game Chaos Chronicles.

Since their last releases of games available in English as well as German, bitComposer now focuses on publishing German-language only games after 2016 for markets including Germany, Austria and Switzerland.

References

External links

Video game publishers
German companies established in 2009
German companies disestablished in 2015 
Video game companies established in 2009
Video game companies disestablished in 2015
Defunct video game companies of Germany